Jane Harvey Fleming is an American film producer and television producer. She was born in New York City, the youngest daughter of Jane (1933–1990), a philanthropist, and Peter E. Fleming Jr. (1929–2009), a criminal-defense lawyer.

A graduate of Princeton University in 1989, Fleming's screen credits include Lovely Molly, The Frozen Ground, Exists (film) and the Disney+ television series The Quest (2022 TV series).

While at Princeton, Fleming won the 1988 National Championship for lightweight crew

Fleming began her career as a financial analyst in Mergers and Acquisitions at the investment banks Drexel Burnham Lambert and James D. Wolfensohn Incorporated. She later joined New Line Cinema, where she ultimately rose to the position of Senior Vice President, Business Development.

A long-time and passionate advocate for women's rights, Fleming is a former two-term president of Women in Film, Los Angeles (2006–2010). She currently serves as its President Emeritus and co-CFO. As part of her advocacy, she is one of fifty Hollywood leaders dedicated to tackling gender inequality as part of the ReFrame campaign. She is also a member of the Producers Guild of America and the Academy of Television Arts & Sciences.

Fleming is a founding partner with Mark Ordesky of Court Five, a multifaceted media company focused on developing and converting diverse intellectual property and brands into filmed entertainment for distribution worldwide.

Filmography

Film
 Tiger Eyes (2012): Executive Producer
 Lovely Molly (2012): Producer
 The Frozen Ground (2013): Producer
 Exists (2014): Producer
 Reality High (2017): Producer

Television
 The Quest (2022): Executive Producer

 The Quest (2014): Executive Producer

References

External links 
 
 Women In Film
 The Hollywood Reporter
 Court Five
 Fleming in Deadline Hollywood

Year of birth missing (living people)
Film producers from New York (state)
Television producers from New York City
American women television producers
Living people
Businesspeople from New York City
Princeton University alumni
21st-century American women